This is a list of countries by rice production in 2020 based on the Food and Agriculture Organization Corporate Statistical Database. The total world rice production for 2020 was 756,743,722 metric tonnes.

In 1961, the total world production was 216 million tonnes.

Production by country 
The table shows the countries with the largest production of rice (paddy rice).

Historical statistics

World production

Large producers

References 
		

Lists of countries by production
rice
!